Calliostoma galea is a species of sea snail, a marine gastropod mollusk in the family Calliostomatidae.

Some authors place this taxon in the subgenus Calliostoma (Benthastelena).

Description

Distribution
This marine species occurs off Japan and Taiwan.

References

 Sakurai, K., 1994. Eight new species of Trochid Genera, Tristichotrochus, Kombologion and Otukaia (Calliostomatinae) from Japan and adjacent waters . Jap. Jour. Malac.4, 53:287–296.

External links

galea
Gastropods described in 1994